Festuca psammophila is a species of grass which is endemic to Central Europe.

Description
The ligule is going around the eciliate membrane. Leaf sheaths have an erect and obtuse auricle and are open with hairy surface while the leaf-blades are conduplicate, elliptic, glaucous, filiform, pruinose and are  broad.

Fertile florets are  diminished at the apex and have 3–8 fertile florets. The glumes are chartaceous, lanceolate and keelless while the apexes and size are different.

Flowers have three stamens while the fruits are ellipsoid and have caryopses with an additional pericarp. Hilum is linear.

References

psammophila
Flora of Europe